Alsea or Alsean (also Yakonan) was two closely related speech varieties spoken along the central Oregon coast until the early 1950s. They are sometimes taken to be different languages, but it is difficult to be sure given the poor state of attestation; Mithun believes they were probably dialects of a single language.

Varieties
 Alsea (Alséya) (†)
 Yaquina (Yakwina, Yakona) (†)

Both are now extinct.

The name Alsea derives from the Coosan name for them, alsí or alsí·, and the Marys River Kalapuyan name for them, alsí·ya. Alsea was last recorded in 1942 from the last speaker, John Albert, by J. P. Harrington.

The name Yaquina derives from the Alsean name for the Yaquina Bay and the Yaquina River region, yuqú·na. Yaquina was last recorded in 1884 by James Owen Dorsey.

Linguistic Affiliation

Alsea is usually considered to belong to the Penutian phylum, and may form part of a Coast Oregon Penutian subgroup together with Siuslaw and the Coosan languages. Numerous lexical resemblances between Alsea and the Northern Wintuan languages, however, are more likely the result of borrowing about 1,500 years ago when the (Northern) Wintuan speech community appears to have been located in Oregon.

Sounds

Consonants

Alsea had 34 consonants:

Their phonetic value has been described as "palatal", or "between alveolar and palatal".

Vowels

Three vowels are listed as /a, i, u/. Long vowel variants of /i, u/ are [eː, oː]. A mid vowel /ə/ occurs as a phonetically inserted vowel sound.

References

Further reading
 Alsea Indian Language (Yaquina, Yakona, Alsean, Alse)
 Campbell, Lyle. (1997). American Indian languages: The historical linguistics of Native America. New York: Oxford University Press. .
 OLAC resources in and about the Alsea language

Language isolates of North America
 
Coast Oregon Penutian languages
Indigenous languages of Oregon
Indigenous languages of the Pacific Northwest Coast
Extinct languages of North America
Languages extinct in the 1940s
1940s disestablishments in Oregon

hr:Alsea jezik